John Henry Price (1854 – 30 November 1907) was a Welsh footballer who played as a centre forward for Wrexham and made 12 appearances for the Wales national football team between 1877 and 1883, scoring four goals, all of which came in one match.

Club career
Price was born in Wrexham and was employed in a local leather works. He started his football career with Wrexham Grosvenor before joining the local Civil Service club, for whom he played as a full-back.

In 1877, he was persuaded by Charles Murless, the Wrexham captain, to switch allegiance. Murless decided to move Price to play at centre forward where his speed "made him a difficult opponent to stop in front of goal". Price was equally good with his head and his feet and was said "never to have played a foul game". With Price in the forward line, and his ability to bring the wing players into the game, Wrexham were able to move one player to the half-back line, to be one of the first clubs to play a 2–3–5 formation.

In his first season, Wrexham entered the inaugural Welsh Cup tournament. After defeating Price's former club in the first round, they had victories over Oswestry and Gwersyllt Foresters (8–0). With only three teams remaining in the tournament at this stage, Wrexham received a bye to the final, at Acton Park, Wrexham, on 30 March 1878 between Wrexham and Druids from Ruabon. The match was a cliffhanger, with no score until the Wrexham forwards charged the Druids' defenders to take the ball over the line to win the game in the final minute, with James Davies being credited with the goal.

The following season, Wrexham again reached the final of the Welsh Cup, where they lost by a single goal to Newtown White Star.

International career
Price's first international appearance came in Wales' second match against Scotland on 5 March 1877. He then became an automatic choice for the Welsh team over the next five seasons, missing only three of the first fifteen internationals. He thus became the first footballer to make more than ten international appearances.

On 25 February 1882 at the Racecourse, Wrexham, Price scored four goals in the 7–1 victory over Ireland. Price's final appearance for his country came against Ireland on 17 March 1883 by when he had ceased playing for Wrexham.

International appearances
Price made twelve appearances for Wales in official international matches, as follows:

Honours

Wrexham

Welsh Cup
Winners: 1877–78
Runners-up:1878-79

References

External links

1854 births
Footballers from Wrexham
1907 deaths
Wales international footballers
Welsh footballers
Wrexham A.F.C. players
Association football forwards
Wrexham Grosvenor F.C. players